Jean Léon Talou (15 August 1835 – 11 January 1900) was a French lawyer and politician who was deputy and then senator for the department of Lot.

Early years

Jean Léon Talou was born on 15 August 1835 in Francoulès, Lot.
He completed his classical studies at the Lycee of Cahors.
Gambetta was his classmate and later his friend.
He studied law at the faculties of Toulouse and Paris, obtain his license, and purchased the office of advocate at the Cahors civil court.

Departmental politics

Talou was involved in politics early in his career, and was strongly opposed to the imperial regime.
In 1870 he was elected municipal councilor of Cahors as opposition candidate.
In 1871 he was elected to the General Counsel of Lot.
He failed to be reelected in 1874, defeated by the former minister Depeyre.
He was reelected to the General Counsel of Lot in 1880.
In 1886 he was reelected to the General Counsel of Lot, defeated Count Murat the younger.

National politics

In the legislative elections of 22 September 1889 Talou defeated the incumbent Count Joachim Joseph André Murat the elder of the Appel au peuple group.
He was reelected for the first district of Cahors, Lot, in 1893.
Talou sat and voted with the radical group.
Léon Talou was elected Senator for Lot on 3 January 1897.
He was a knight of the Legion of Honour.
He died in office on 11 January 1900 in Paris.

Notes

Sources

1835 births
1900 deaths
People from Lot (department)
Politicians from Occitania (administrative region)
French republicans
Members of the 5th Chamber of Deputies of the French Third Republic
Members of the 6th Chamber of Deputies of the French Third Republic
French Senators of the Third Republic
Senators of Lot (department)
French general councillors